Banana is the common name for flowering plants of the genus Musa and for the fruit they produce.

Banana or bananas may also refer to:

In nature
 Ensete ventricosum (Ethiopian banana, false banana, enset), an important foodcrop in Ethiopia
 Nymphoides aquatica (banana plant), an aquatic species known for its unusual root structure 
 Strelitzia nicolai (wild banana), a banana-like plant with an erect woody stem

Places
 Banana, Cape Verde, a settlement on Santiago Island
 Banana, Democratic Republic of the Congo, a small seaport in Kongo Central Province
 Banana, Florida, an unincorporated community
 Banana, Kiribati, a settlement on Kiritimati Island
 Banana Island, Lagos, an artificial island in Nigeria
 Banana Islands, Sierra Leone
 Banana Lake, Florida
 Banana River, Florida
 Shire of Banana, a local government area in Queensland, Australia
 Banana, Queensland, Australia, a small town in the Shire of Banana
 Green Banana Hole, a blue hole near Florida

Arts and entertainment

Film and television
 Bananas (film), a 1971 comedy film directed by and starring Woody Allen
 Bananas!*, a 2009 Swedish documentary directed by Fredrik Gertten
 Banana, a 2010 short film from the Despicable Me franchise
 Banana (film), a 2015 comedy-drama film directed by Andrea Jublin
 The Bananas (TV series), a 1969 Canadian children's television series
 Banana (TV series), a 2015 British anthology series by Russell T. Davies

Media
 WWBN ("Banana 101.5"), a rock music radio station in Michigan

Music
 Banana (band), a former Yugoslav pop rock band
 Bananas (album), an album by English rock band Deep Purple
 The Velvet Underground & Nico, a rock album sometimes referred to as the "Banana Album"
 "Banana" (Anitta song) (with Becky G), a track from the 2019 album Kisses by Anitta
 "Banana" (Conkarah song), a 2019 song by Conkarah featuring Shaggy
 "Bananas (Who You Gonna Call?)", a 1998 single by Queen Latifah
 "Bananas", a track from the 2008 album Inherit by Free Kitten
 "Sweet Banana", the regimental march of the Rhodesian African Rifles
"Day-O (The Banana Boat Song)",a traditional Jamaican folk song.
"Banana", a skit from the 2005 album Arular by M.I.A.

Other arts and entertainment
 Bananas (literary magazine), a British literary magazine from 1975 until 1979
 Banana (magazine), an Asian-American themed magazine
 Banana (video game), a video game on the Nintendo Entertainment System released only in Japan
 Bananas Comedy Club, two venues for stand-up comedy in the northeastern United States

People
 Banana (name), a list of people with the given name, surname, pen name or stage name
 Banana (slur), an Asian person living in a Western country who has lost touch with their Asian cultural identity
 Robert "Bananas" Foster, a member of the American electronic band Freezepop

Other uses
 Banana equivalent dose, an informal measurement of ionizing radiation exposure
 Savannah Bananas, an amateur baseball team in the Coastal Plain League
 Banana', a dialect of the Bamayo language of Borneo, Indonesia
 Build Absolutely Nothing Anywhere Near Anything, acronym used by "not in my backyard" (NIMBY) folks opposed to land development

See also 
 
 

 Banana connector, a single-wire electrical connector
 In chemistry, a bent bond, also referred to as a "banana bond"
 Checkside punt (or banana kick), a kicking style used in Australian rules and rugby league football
 Joseph Bonanno (1905–2002), Italian-American Mafia boss also known as "Joe Bananas"
 Antonio Caponigro (1912–1980), American mobster also known as "Tony Bananas"

 Bannana, a genus of goblin spiders from China
 Banania, a chocolate drink

 Anana (disambiguation)
 Bana (disambiguation)
 Banan (disambiguation)
 Banana republic (disambiguation)
 Bananana (disambiguation)
 Banani (disambiguation)
 Going bananas (disambiguation)